Horsford is a village six miles north of Norwich, England which is surrounded by the Horsford Forest and is named after the dried up section of the River Hor. Its population has seen a steady increase since the Second World War, growing from 750 in 1945 to 4,163 at the 2011 Census.

There are various explanations of the village name. It is usually said to derive from 'horse ford', but it has also been suggested that it comes from the River Hor on which the village stands (more usually known to locals as 'the Beck'). A third explanation is that it comes from Horsa, the name of a Saxon chief.

The surrounding Horsford Forest has been designated a County Wildlife Site. The rare silver-studded blue butterfly has a colony in this forest.

The motte of the demolished Horsford Castle lies to the east of the village.

Sport
The village has produced three footballers of note: Barry Bridges, who returned to Horsford to manage the village team Horsford United, Chris Sutton and Jack Gulley who played at DESA before travelling to America to turn professional. The village has two football clubs Horsford F.C. and Horsford United F.C.

The Manor Park cricket ground is home to the village team and the Norfolk County Cricket Club.

Public Pits 
These small areas of woodland were formerly public pits awarded to the parishioners of Horsford under the Enclosures Act of 1802.

In 1913 the Horsford Publics Pits Charity was formed to administer these pits in the parish. Initially income was from shooting and grazing rights, but in the late 20th century they were let to civil contractors who filled them with spoil from construction sites and the Trustees then planted them with trees.

Since 1997 the pits have been leased by the Horsford Parish Council who have undertaken to manage and maintain them as havens for wild life and as amenity areas for the parishioners of Horsford.

Neighbourhood Plan 

Neighbourhood legislation gave communities the power to develop a shared vision for their neighbourhood and shape the growth and development of their local area.

Once adopted, a Neighbourhood Plan is a legal document which the planning authority has to consider when determining a planning application although on occasions other factors may be taken into account which conflict with the plan.

In 2015 the Parish Council decided to consider the development of a neighbourhood plan and a steering group was formed made up of some councillors and some interested residents. Grants were applied for and a professional project manager was employed to give guidance and direction. Over the next two years a wide-ranging consultation took place and the plan was published in draft form. The plan was scrutinised by Broadland DC and an independent examiner before being put to the residents in a referendum which approved it by a very large majority

References

External links

Horsford cricket club
Horsford Youth Under 16's FC
Just Horsford
Horsford Players

 
Villages in Norfolk
Civil parishes in Norfolk
Broadland